The Poetry Symposium (Greek: Symposio Poiisis or Simbosio Piisis) is held every year during the beginning of July.  It was first held in 1981 by the shield of the University of Patras.  Every year, the sayings of the Poetry Symposium are different.

Hundreds of journalists had presented in literary works, critics and poems which journalizes the Act Of The Poetry Symposium which is achieved every year.

The Poetry Symposium are Administrated by the Organized Committee. In 2007, its members of the Organized Committee are:

Stavros Koumpias
Sokratis Skartsis, poet
Lydia Stefanou, poet, translator
Alexis Lykourgiotis, professor of the University of Patras
Xenofon Verykios, poet, professor of the University of patas
Dimitris Katsaganis, poet, critic
Kostas Kremmydas, poet, editor of the periodical Mandragoras (Μανδραγόρας)?
Dimitris Charitos, poet, cinematographer critic
Sotiris Varnavas, poet, professor of the University of Patras
Kostas Kapelas, Journalist Of The Polyedro Bookstore
Giorgos Kentrotis, poet, translator, professor of the Ionian University
Savvas Mihail, critic
Thanasis Nakas, professor of the University of Patras
Xeni Skartsi, poet
Honorary Members are:
Michais G. Meraklis, critic, former professor of the University of Athens
Andreas Belezinis, philologist, critic

Historic Registered Symposia And Topics

July 3–5, 1981 - I Symposium: The First Postwar Generation. The Poetry In Life And In - Poetry And Technology. Theory And Language Of Poetry
July 2–4, 1982 - II Symposium: Critics And Poems
July 1–7, 1983 - III Symposium: Dedication to Constantine Cavafy
July 6–8, 1984 - IV Symposium: Dedication to Folk Music
July 5–7, 1985 - V Symposium: Commons And Poetry
July 4–6, 1986 - VI Symposium: Modern Greek Postwar Poetry (1945-1985)
July 3–5, 1987 - VII Symposium: Poetry For Children
July 1–3, 1988 - VIII Symposium: Poetry And Prose Writing
July 7–9, 1989 - IX Symposium: Kostis Palamas: His Timeline And Our Timeline
July 6–8, 1990 - X Symposium: Dionysios Solomos
July 5–7, 1991 - XI Smposium: Poetic Anthologies
July 3–5, 1992 - XII Symposium: Andreas Kalvos
July 2–4, 1993 - XIII Symposium: Nationality And Poetry
July 1–3, 1994 - XIV Symposium: Andreas Empeirikos, Yiannis Ritsos, Periodicals
July 7–9. 1995 - XV Symposium: Poetry And Music
July 5–7, 1996 - XVI Symposium: Angelos Sikelianos
July 4–6, 1997 - XVII Symposium: Ancient Greek Poem And The Time
July 3–5, 1998 - XVIII Symposium: Poetry And Language
July 2–4, 1999 - XIX Symposium: The Stream And Synchronized Poetry
July 7–9, 2000 - XX Symposium: The Poetry In Our Lives
July 6–8, 2001 - XXI Symposium: Our Lost Poets
July 5–7, 2002 - XXII Symposium: These Poems We Love
July 4–6, 2003 - XXIII Symposium: The Translations Of Poetry
July 2–4, 2004 - XXIV Symposium: The Poetry Of Anthem
July 1–3, 2005 - XXV Symposium: 25 Years Of Symposium - 25 Years Of Poetry.
June 29 - July 2, 2006 - XXVI Symposiym: Poetry And Romance. (In organized committee of 2006, it was presented by Christos Chatzitheodorou, Deanship of the University of Patras)
2007 - XXVII Symposium: Why Poetry

External links
Official website 

University of Patras
Greek poetry